Westmoreland City is an unincorporated community located within North Huntingdon Township, Westmoreland County, Pennsylvania, United States.

References

Unincorporated communities in Westmoreland County, Pennsylvania
Unincorporated communities in Pennsylvania